Darren White may refer to:

 Darren White (politician), Sheriff of Bernalillo County, New Mexico and 2008 U.S. House candidate in New Mexico's 1st District
 Darren "Daz" White, British musician
 Darren White, known as dBridge, British drum and bass musician